Victoria Institution (College), established in 1932, is one of the oldest undergraduate women's college in Kolkata, West Bengal, India. It is affiliated with the University of Calcutta.

Departments

Science
Chemistry 
Mathematics
Psychology
Physics
Botany
Zoology
Geography
Economics

Arts and commerce
Bengali
English
Sanskrit
Urdu
History
Political Science
Philosophy 
Commerce

Accreditation
The college is recognized by the University Grants Commission (UGC). In 2006, it was accredited by the National Assessment and Accreditation Council (NAAC), and awarded B grade, an accreditation that has since then expired.

See also 
List of colleges affiliated to the University of Calcutta
Education in India
Education in West Bengal

References

External links
Victoria Institution (College)

Educational institutions established in 1932
University of Calcutta affiliates
Universities and colleges in Kolkata
Women's universities and colleges in West Bengal
1932 establishments in India